Bopstacle Course is a jazz album by vibraphonist Terry Gibbs, recorded in 1974 for Xanadu Records.

Track listing

 "Bopstacle Course" (Gibbs) - 4:39
 "Body and Soul" (Eyton, Green, Heyman, Sour) - 7:06
 "Waltz For My Children" (Gibbs) - 4:42
 "Softly, As in a Morning Sunrise" (Hammerstein, Romberg) - 6:04
 "Manha de Carnaval" (Bonfa, Maria) - 4:48
 "Do You Mind?" (Gibbs) - 5:03
 "Kathleen" (Gibbs) - 4:08
 "I'm Getting Sentimental over You" (Bassman, Washington) - 6:41

Personnel 

 Terry Gibbs - vibes
 Barry Harris - piano
 Sam Jones - bass guitar
 Alan Dawson - drums

1974 albums
Terry Gibbs albums
Xanadu Records albums